The graphics address remapping table (GART), also known as the graphics aperture remapping table, or graphics translation table (GTT), is an I/O memory management unit (IOMMU) used by Accelerated Graphics Port (AGP) and PCI Express (PCIe) graphics cards. The GART allows the graphics card direct memory access (DMA) to the host system memory, through which buffers of textures, polygon meshes and other data are loaded. AMD later reused the same mechanism for I/O virtualization with other peripherals including disk controllers and network adapters.

A GART is used as a means of data exchange between the main memory and video memory through which buffers (i.e. paging/swapping) of textures, polygon meshes and other data are loaded, but can also be used to expand the amount of video memory available for systems with only integrated or shared graphics (i.e. no discrete or inbuilt graphics processor), such as Intel HD Graphics processors.  However, this type of memory (expansion) remapping has a caveat that affects the entire system: specifically, any GART, pre-allocated memory becomes pooled and cannot be utilised for any other purposes but graphics memory and display rendering.

Operating system support

Linux 
Jeff Hartmann served as the primary maintainer of the Linux kernel's agpgart driver, which began as part of Brian Paul's Utah GLX accelerated Mesa 3D driver project. The developers primarily targeted Linux 2.4.x kernels, but made patches available against older 2.2.x kernels. Dave Jones heavily reworked agpgart for the Linux 2.6.x kernels, along with more contributions from Jeff Hartmann.

FreeBSD 
In FreeBSD, the agpgart driver appeared in its 4.1 release.

Solaris 
AGPgart support was introduced into Solaris Express Developer Edition as of its 7/05 release.

See also 
 Direct Rendering Manager

References 

Graphics hardware